Chuckie Egg 2 is the sequel to 1983 video game Chuckie Egg. Released in 1985 and featuring the same lead character, Henhouse Harry, the game took players beyond the single-screen format of the original into a large factory. Here, Harry had to assemble a toy-carrying chocolate egg from its constituent parts (sugar, milk and cocoa powder) and deliver it to the dispatch lorry. On completion the quest restarted, with more monsters and an alternative toy.

Gameplay
The game features 120 screens arranged in 10x12 grid, beginning at the top of left. Some moving objects are fatal to touch, while others bounce Harry around the screen. The factory is divided into thematic sections. Milk is collected in an ice zone, cocoa in a purple zone in which most enemies are monkeys, sugar in an industrial blue zone and the toy in a brick zone that bears the most resemblance to the original game. The egg maker, which needs all ingredients and the toy to function, is located in a zone infamous for allowing Harry to fall to his death through the "slippery" pipes.

Several transitional zones exist between these task-centred areas, and due to the game's non-linear layout a number of these can be bypassed in any successful completion.

After delivery of the completed egg, the game restarts with additional monsters and a different toy to assemble. In order, these are: a motorbike, a vintage car, a yacht, a space shuttle.

Players receive points for moving to a new screen for the first time, as well as for picking up (by moving over them) various objects including fruit, tools and eggs. The scoring received for these objects is inconsistent both between screens and each time the game is played.

Development 
Nigel Alderton, the author of the original Chuckie Egg, had been working on a Mr. Do!-style follow up that never came to fruition. With Alderton's move to Ocean Software, A&F took development in a different direction.

To aid in their publicity, A&F organised a Chuckie Egg 2 competition, pitting contestants against each other in regional heats and a national final. Crash, a gaming magazine popular at the time, was tasked with adjudication. Prizes included silver and gold egglets and up to £500 cash. The winner of this contest is unknown.

Release and ports 
Chuckie Egg 2 was originally released on cassette by A&F Software for the Amstrad CPC, ZX Spectrum and the Commodore 64 priced at GBP£6.90.

It was later bundled on Virgin Games' Now Games 2 compilation along with Airwolf, Cauldron, Tir Na Nog and World Cup Football.

It was released for the Amiga and the Atari ST in 1988.

Reception 
Reviews at the time of its release were lukewarm.

In its Issue 24 "Lookback at 1985", Crash magazine wrote:

This was despite rating the game at 81%, one percent higher than the original Chuckie Egg.

Sinclair User Issue 39 stated:

CPC Zone concludes:

References

External links 
 Moby Games Chuckie Egg II
 The Chuckie Egg Professionals Resource Kit Home

1985 video games
ZX Spectrum games
Commodore 64 games
Amstrad CPC games
Atari ST games
Amiga games
Video games developed in the United Kingdom
Single-player video games